This is a list of the number-one songs of 2021 in Panama. The charts are published by Monitor Latino, based on airplay across radio stations in Panama using the Radio Tracking Data, LLC in real time, with its chart week running from Monday to Sunday.

In 2021 so far, fourteen songs reached number one in Panama, with eight songs being collaborations; a fifteenth single, "Hawái" by Maluma featuring the Weeknd, began its run at number one in November 2020. In fact, seventeen acts topped the chart as either lead or featured artists, with eleven—Eddy Lover, El Roockie, Emilia, Alex Rose, Juhn, Martín Machore, Magic Juan, Rauw Alejandro, Prince Royce, Mau y Ricky, Lucy Vives, Kampi and Rey King—achieving their first number-one single in Panama.

With "Olvidemos" topping the Panamanian charts, Eddy Lover and El Roockie became the fifth and sixth Panamanian acts to reach number one in their home country, following Joey Montana, Sech, Jace López and Real Phantom. Later, Martin Machore became the seventh Panamanian act to reach number one, as "Pegaito" topped the Panamanian charts.

"Chica Super Poderosa" by Martin Machore and Magic Juan was the longest-running number-one of the year, and later ranked as the best-performing single of 2021 in Panama, leading the chart for eight non-consecutive weeks.

Maluma is the only act to have more than a number-one song, with four.

Chart history

References 

Panamanian music-related lists
Panama
2021 in Panama